Keri Hehn (born May 13, 1981) is an American swimmer.  Hehn is originally from Fargo, North Dakota, but now lives in Los Angeles and swims for the Trojan Swim Club under coach Dave Salo.  Away from swimming, Hehn is a full-time public relations professional.

At the 2009 US National Championships and World Championship Trials, Hehn placed second in the 200m breaststroke, earning a place to compete at the 2009 World Aquatics Championships in Rome.  In Rome, Hehn placed ninth in the 200m breaststroke with a time of 2:23.30, just missing out on a place in the final.

References

External links
 
 

1981 births
Living people
American female breaststroke swimmers
Minnesota Golden Gophers women's swimmers
Sportspeople from Fargo, North Dakota
Swimmers at the 2007 Pan American Games
Pan American Games bronze medalists for the United States
Pan American Games medalists in swimming
Medalists at the 2007 Pan American Games